Thomas Richard Kerry Goulstone (5 June 1936 – 29 January 2013) was Dean of St Asaph from 1993 to 2001.

Goulstone was born in Llanelli and educated at Llanelli Boys’ Grammar School, St David's College, Lampeter and St Michael's Theological College, Llandaff and ordained in 1960.  He began his ordained ministry with  curacies in Llanbadarn Fawr and Carmarthen after which he held  incumbencies in Solva, Gorslas and Burry Port. His last post before becoming Dean of Asaph was as the Archdeacon of Carmarthen.

References

1936 births
People from Llanelli
People educated at Llanelli Boys' Grammar School
Alumni of the University of Wales, Lampeter
Alumni of St Michael's College, Llandaff
Deans of St Asaph
2013 deaths
Archdeacons of Carmarthen